Domingo de Borja may refer to:

 Domingo I de Borja, grandfather of Pope Calixtus III and early member of the House of Borja from the Señorío de Torre de Canals
 Juan Domingo de Borja, head of the main branch of the House of Borja, father of Pope Calixtus III

See also 
 House of Borja